Ghuraba may refer to:
 Ghuraba (Islam), an Islamic eschatological epithet
 Ghuraba, Safad, a former village in Palestine

See also 
 
 Ghurabah, a place in Yemen